The fool's mate is the quickest possible checkmate in the game of chess.

Fool's mate may also refer to:

 Fool's Mate (album), by Peter Hammill
 Fool's Mate (1956 film), a 1956 French film
 Fool's Mate (1989 film), a 1989 German film